Anwar Hamed (born 1957) is a Palestinian-Hungarian novelist, poet and author. He was born in Anabta, Palestine, and went to Hungary for college. His first short stories were published in Arabic when he was still a teenager in the West Bank, but after his move to Hungary, he started writing in Hungarian. His first novels were written in this language. Since 2004, he has been living in London, where he works for BBC Arabic
His short story entitled “The Key”, published in English, was longlisted to British Science Fiction Association Award 2019. His most recent novel is Shijan, which was published in Arabic in March 2019.

His novel Jaffa Prepares Morning Coffee was longlisted for the 2013 Arabic Booker Prize.

Selected works
 The Bridge of Babylon
 Stones of Pain
 Scheherazade Tells Tales No More
 The Game of Love and Pride and Other Idiocies 
 Valse Triste
 Seventy-Two Virgins and a Confused Lad 
 Jaffa Prepares Morning Coffee
Jenin 2002
 Mind the Gap (poetry)
 Oh, Those Days! (short stories)
 Literary theory: An attempt towards the definition of the function of literature (theory)
 “ Outsider “

References

1957 births
Living people
Palestinian novelists
Palestinian journalists
21st-century Hungarian novelists
People from Anabta
Hungarian male novelists
21st-century Hungarian male writers